Bay Horse is a sparsely populated hamlet in the English county of Lancashire.  It lies between Lancaster and Preston to the north and south respectively.

Geography
To the west is the Irish Sea, and to the east is the Forest of Bowland, partly owned by the Royal Family.

Community
The local area is mostly farmland, the nearest large urban area being Lancaster, approximately five miles away. Approximately 100 inhabitants reside in Bay Horse.  The main road through Bay Horse is Whams Lane, which is used by motorcyclists on their way to Devils Bridge at Kirkby Lonsdale.

The Hamlet is served by the nearby St John's Church (CofE) in Ellel, which acts as its parish church.

Travel
The Lancaster Canal bisects the village, and the M6 motorway runs through the village.

Bay Horse railway station closed due to low usage in the 1960s.

Pub
There are no amenities in the hamlet, apart from a single pub, the Bay Horse Inn, after which the village is named.  Even though the boundaries of Bay Horse are uncertain, there is a riding school on the outskirts called Bay Horse School.

References

External links

Villages in Lancashire
Geography of the City of Lancaster